Finland-Italy relations  are foreign relations between Finland and Italy. Both countries established diplomatic relations on 6 September 1919.  Finland has an embassy in Rome, Italy has an embassy in Helsinki. Both countries are full members of Council of Europe, Organization for Security and Co-operation in Europe and of the European Union.

The political relations between Finland and Italy are excellent according to the embassies of both nations.

High level visits
In 1971, President of Finland Urho Kekkonen made a three-day state visit to Italy. 

In 2012, Prime Minister of Italy Mario Monti visited Helsinki for meetings with Jyrki Katainen, Finland's prime minister.

In 2019, the Minister of Foreign Affairs of Finland, Timo Soini met his Italian counterpart Enzo Moavero Milanesi in Rome.

In 2022, Prime Minister of Finland Sanna Marin visited Rome to meet with Italy’s Prime Minister Mario Draghi. During the meeting, the Italian Prime Minister gave his support to Finland and Sweden's decision to join NATO.

Trade
In 2020, Finland imported goods worth 1716 million Euros from Italy, making Italy the 10th largest importer to Finland.

In 2021 the total value of exported goods from Italy to Finland was 2.0 billion euros and Finland's exports to Italy amounted to 2.9 billion Euros. The most exported goods from Italy to Finland were machinery and transport equipment (807 million), chemical substances (242 million), and metals (150 million). Respectively, the most exported goods from Finland to Italy were machinery and transport equipment (1.5 billion), metals (652 million), and paper and cardboard products (259 million).

In Italy there are about 90 companies, which are at least partially owned by Finns. These companies include Wärtsilä, Kemira, Ahlström, Nokia, F-Secure, Kone, Metso, UPM, Stora Enso, Metsä Board, Fiskars-Iittala, Qvantel and Tapojärvi. In Finland companies owned by Italians include, Finnlines, Nautor’s Swan, Sako, Meiran paahtimo, Prysmianin and Prima Power.

Culture
Over 200 000 journeys to Italy are made by Finns yearly. The number of Finns with permanent residence in Italy is estimated to be 4 000 by the Finnish Embassy in Rome. In Italy the Finnish language can be studied in the University of Bologna, University of Florence and University of Naples. Additionally, the Finland Society organizes Finnish language courses open to everyone. 

The Finnish Institute in Rome provides research opportunities, courses and residences for Finnish or Finland-based students and researchers. The institute focuses on ancient and medieval history, classical philology, classical archaeology, and art history.

The Italian Culture Institute in Helsinki offers Italian language courses, cultural events, and materials for advancement of Finland-Italy cultural relations.

Agreements
Agreements between Finland and Italy include
Trade and Maritime Agreement, 1925 (amendment 1950, repeal of certain provisions 1988)
Agreement on the Exchange of Marital Status Notices, 1928
Agreement on the Legalization of Certificates of Origin, 1930
Agreement on the Reciprocal Abolition of Medical and Consular Certificates, 1950
Payment Agreement, 1951 (additional protocol 1953, additional agreement 1955)
Agreement on the Removal of Entry Stamps, 1954 (amendment 1958)
Trainee exchange agreements, 1962
Agreement on the Customs Clearance and Taxation of Aircraft Used in Reciprocal Air Transport, 1973
Agreement on Reciprocal Tax Relief for Cultural Institutions, 1974
Agreement on Cultural and Scientific Cooperation, 1976
Veterinary Agreement on the export of meat from Finland to Italy, 1976
Agreement on the International Carriage of Goods by Road, 1977
Tax Convention, 1983
Air Transport Agreement, 1985
Agreement on Cooperation and Mutual Assistance in Customs Matters, 1990
Agreement on the Reciprocal Protection of Classified Information, 2008

See also
Foreign relations of Finland
Foreign relations of Italy
Italians in Finland

References

 
Italy
Bilateral relations of Italy